Pečice is a municipality and village in Příbram District in the Central Bohemian Region of the Czech Republic. It has about 400 inhabitants.

Administrative parts
Villages of Drsník and Pečičky are administrative parts of Pečice.

Etymology
The name is derived from the personal name Pecka. The original name of the village was Pecčice, meaning "village of Pecka's people".

Geography
It lies in the Benešov Uplands. The Lišovický Brook flows through the municipality. It supplies two ponds in the area.

History
The first written mention of Pečice is in a deed of King John of Bohemia from 1336. In the 17th century, it belonged to the Milín estate, then in the 18th century, it was part of the Karlštejn estate. The independent municipality was established in 1864.

Sights
The landmark of Chraštice is the Church of Saint Lawrence. It is an early Gothic church from the mid-13th century.

References

External links

Villages in Příbram District